Littlethorpe is a village and civil parish in the Harrogate district, in the English county of North Yorkshire, near the city of Ripon.

Littlethorpe has a place of worship, St Michael and All Angels' Church, built in 1878.

Thorpe Lodge on the Knaresborough Road is a Grade II listed building.

References

External links

Village History

Villages in North Yorkshire
Civil parishes in North Yorkshire
Borough of Harrogate